This article is a tabular depiction of those generals who held command at the army group echelon or higher on the Western Front of World War II during 1944-1945, and is intended to serve as a reference that can be linked to by other World War II articles. Headquarters and commander names are linked for ease of reference.

 12th Army Group Report of Operations Volume 1, 31 July 1945
 Georg Tessin (CDROM edition), Verbände und Truppen der deutschen Wehrmacht und der Waffen-SS im Zweiten Weltkrieg 1939-1945, Osnabrück: Biblio Verlag, 1967-1998 (17 volumes)
 Mary Williams (compiler), Chronology 1941-1945, Washington: GPO, 1994
 Steven Zaloga, Operation Nordwind 1945, Oxford: Osprey, 2010, 

Western European theatre of World War II